Senkivka is a land three-way border crossing between Ukraine with Russia and Belarus on the Ukrainian side, just north of the village of Senkivka, in Chernihiv Raion, Chernihiv Oblast.

It is the Ukrainian side of the Novye Yurkovichi–Senkivka–Vesyalowka border tripoint.

Overview
Across the border on the Russian side is a border checkpoint Novye Yurkovichi located near Novye Yurkovichi (Bryansk Oblast), on the Belarusian side is a border checkpoint Vesyalowka.

The type of crossing is automobile, status - international. The types of transportation for automobile crossings are passenger and freight.

The port of entry is part of the Senkivka customs post of Chernihiv customs.

Points of interest
In 1975 here was erected a stele "monument of Friendship (Three Sisters)" (monument Druzhby ("Tri sestry")) where in June every year take place several festivities among the people from the Republic of Belarus, Ukraine, and the Russian Federation.

On 9 November 2012 at Senkivka was installed the first border post of the State Border of Ukraine with the Russian Federation. The first border post of the State Border of Ukraine with Belarus was installed on 13 November 2014.

In 2014 the access to the festivals through Vesyalowka and Novye Yurkovichi were closed for Ukrainian visitors.

See also
 Russia–Ukraine border
 Belarus–Ukraine border
 Russia–Belarus border
 State border of Ukraine

References

External links
 State Border Guard of Ukraine website 
 Shell War in Ukraine: The village with Russia and Belarus on its doorstep. BBC News, 26 April 2022

Russia–Ukraine border crossings
Belarus–Ukraine border crossings
Geography of Chernihiv Oblast
Border tripoints